Pál Ilku (8 October 1912 – 13 July 1973) was a Hungarian soldier and politician, who served as Minister of Education from 1961 until his death. He had significant part in the organizing of the police strengths (pufajkások) which consolidated the János Kádár regime after the crushing of the Hungarian Revolution of 1956.

References
 Magyar Életrajzi Lexikon

1912 births
1973 deaths
People from the Kingdom of Hungary
Hungarian Communist Party politicians
Members of the Hungarian Working People's Party
Members of the Hungarian Socialist Workers' Party
Education ministers of Hungary
Members of the National Assembly of Hungary (1947–1949)
Members of the National Assembly of Hungary (1949–1953)
Members of the National Assembly of Hungary (1953–1958)
Members of the National Assembly of Hungary (1958–1963)
Members of the National Assembly of Hungary (1963–1967)
Members of the National Assembly of Hungary (1971–1975)
Hungarian soldiers